United Nations Security Council Resolution 143 was adopted on July 14, 1960. With Congolese requests for assistance in front of him, following the Mutiny of the Force Publique, Secretary-General of the United Nations Dag Hammarskjold had called a meeting for the evening of July 13, acting under Article 99 of the Charter. After the Secretary-General's report and a request for military assistance by the President and Prime Minister of the Republic of the Congo (Leopoldville) to protect its territory, the Council called upon Belgium to withdraw its troops from the territory and authorized the Secretary-General to take the necessary steps to provide the Government with such military assistance that the national security forces may be able to meet fully their tasks. The Council asked the Secretary General to report to the Security Council as appropriate.

The resolution was adopted with eight votes to none; France, the Republic of China, and the United Kingdom abstained.

See also
List of United Nations Security Council Resolutions 101 to 200 (1953–1965)
Resolutions 145, 146, 157, 161 and 169
The Congo Crisis
United Nations Operation in the Congo

References

External links
 
Text of the Resolution at undocs.org
 Note that S/4387 is the UN documents symbol for UNSCR 143.

 0143
 0143
 0143
1960 in the Republic of the Congo (Léopoldville)
1960 in Belgium
July 1960 events